Sir Heneage Finch, 3rd Earl of Winchilsea (1628 – 28 September 1689) of Eastwell, Kent, was the 3rd Earl of Winchilsea.

Early life
Finch was the only surviving son of Thomas Finch, 2nd Earl of Winchilsea and the former Cecille Wentworth of Gosfield Hall, Essex.

His paternal grandparents were Sir Moyle Finch, 1st Baronet  and Elizabeth Finch, suo jure 1st Countess of Winchilsea. His father inherited his grandfather's baronetcy from his uncle, Sir Theophilus Finch, 2nd Baronet, who died without issue in 1619. His maternal grandparents were John Wentworth, High Sheriff of Essex and Cecily Unton. His first cousin was Heneage Finch, 1st Earl of Nottingham.

He was educated at Queens' College, Cambridge.

Career
On his return from Ottoman territory in June 1668, King Charles II remarked to Finch, "My Lord, you have not only built a town, but peopled it too". Winchilsea, in an obvious reference to Charles' own brood of natural children, replied that after all, he was the King's representative.

Lord Finch was appointed by his friend George Monck, 1st Duke of Albemarle a Governor of Dover Castle, and Lord Warden of the Cinque Ports in July 1660. He was also Lord Lieutenant of Kent and afterwards ambassador to the Ottoman Empire, and served in this capacity between 1668 and 1672.

Samuel Pepys first referred to him as the Lord Winchilsea.

King Charles II had landed at Kent on his way to London to secure the throne on 25 May 1660. The King arrived in Dover with 20 ships and frigates, the Lord General and his lifeguard were accompanied by the Earl of Winchelsea to the cheer of the crowding locals gathered upon the beach to witness a salute fired from the guns of Dover Castle. The King created him Baron FitzHerbert, of Eastwell in the County of Kent, on 26 June 1660.

Personal life
Finch was married four times and was the father of at least sixteen children. His first marriage was on 21 May 1645 to the Hon. Diana Willoughby, the eldest daughter of Francis Willoughby, 5th Baron Willoughby of Parham and Elizabeth Cecil (a younger daughter and co-heiress of Edward Cecil, 1st Viscount Wimbledon). She died and was buried at Eastwell on 27 March 1648.

Before her death in 1673, they were the parents of:

 William Finch, styled Viscount Maidstone (–1672), who died at sea aboard the Royal Charles during the Battle of Solebay; he married Elizabeth Wyndham, a daughter of Thomas Wyndham, of Felbrigg Hall.
 Lady Frances Finch (d. 1712), who married Thomas Thynne, 1st Viscount Weymouth.
 Heneage Finch, 5th Earl of Winchilsea (1657–1726), who married Anne Kingsmill, the daughter of Sir William Kingsmill.
 Hon. Thomas Finch (b. 1658), who was born before the family went to the Ottoman Empire.

His third marriage was to Catherine Norcliffe on 10 April 1673. The daughter of Sir Thomas Norcliffe and Hon. Dorothy Fairfax (fifth daughter of Thomas Fairfax, 1st Viscount Fairfax), she was twice a widow from her marriages to Christopher Lister, of Thornton, York, and Sir John Wentworth, of Elmshall, York.

His final marriage was on 29 October 1681 to Elizabeth Ayres, only daughter and heiress of John Ayres of London. Before his death in 1689, they were the parents of:

 John Finch, 6th Earl of Winchilsea, who died unmarried and without issue.

Lord Winchilsea died on 28 September 1689. He was succeeded in his titles by his grandson Charles, as his eldest son William predeceased him.

Descendants
Through his daughter Frances, he was a grandfather of Henry Thynne (1675–1708), and Frances Thynne (who married Sir Robert Worsley, 4th Baronet).

References

External links 
pepysdiary.com
The Earls of Winchilsea
A True and Exact Relation of the Late Prodigious Earthquake & eruption of Mount Aetna, or Monte-Gibello – full digital facsimile at Linda Hall Library
 Heneage Finch, 3rd Earl of Winchilsea at The British Museum

|-

1628 births
1689 deaths
17th-century English nobility
03
Alumni of Queens' College, Cambridge
01
Lord-Lieutenants of Kent
Lord-Lieutenants of Somerset
Lords Warden of the Cinque Ports
Finch
Heneage
17th-century English diplomats
People from Winchelsea